The Baudette – Rainy River International Bridge is an international bridge connecting Rainy River, Ontario, Canada, with Baudette, Minnesota, United States, across the Rainy River.

The bridge marks the western terminus of Ontario Highway 11 (as Atwood Avenue) and the northern terminus of Minnesota State Highway 72 (International Drive). The bridge is owned by Ontario and Minnesota, and is managed by MTO (with funding from the Government of Canada) and MnDOT, respectively. The bridge carries 2 lanes of traffic and a  sidewalk for pedestrian traffic. Customs plazas are located on both side of the bridge.

Downriver from the bridge is Baudette-Rainy River Rail Bridge, built in 1901 for Ontario and Rainy River Railway and now used by CN Rail.

Replacement

A new replacement bridge has been completed and opened to traffic in October 2020. Destruction of the old structure has begun and is expected to be completed by fall 2021 when a Grand opening celebration and ribbon cutting ceremony for the new bridge will take place.

Border crossing

The Baudette–Rainy River Border Crossing connects the cities of Baudette, Minnesota and Rainy River, Ontario at the Baudette–Rainy River International Bridge.  The Port of Entry was established in 1960 when the International Bridge was completed.  Prior to 1960, the cities were connected via point-to-point ferry service as well as a railroad bridge.

References

1960 establishments in Minnesota
1960 establishments in Ontario
2020 establishments in Minnesota
2020 establishments in Ontario
Baudette, Minnesota
Bridges completed in 1960
Bridges completed in 2020
Buildings and structures in Lake of the Woods County, Minnesota
Buildings and structures in Rainy River District
Canada–United States bridges
Road bridges in Ontario
Road bridges in Minnesota
Steel bridges in the United States
Steel bridges in Canada
Transport in Rainy River District
Transportation in Lake of the Woods County, Minnesota
Truss bridges in Canada
Truss bridges in the United States